Stephanoceratidae is a family of planulate and coronate ammonites within the Stephanoceratoidea. Shells are evolute so that all whorls are exposed and have strong ribbing that bifurcates, that is splits in two, on the flanks. Many have tubercles at the point of bifurcation. Whorl sections are generally subequant; the outer rim, or venter, commonly rounded.

Stephanoceratidae is derived from the Otoitidae. Their fossils are found in upper Middle- and lower Upper Jurassic sediments.

Subfamilies and genera
Cadomitinae
Frebolditinae
Garantianinae
Mollistephaninae
Stephanoceratinae
Ermoceras
Kosmermoceras
Kumatostephanus
Skirroceras
Skolekostephanus
Stemmatoceras
Telermoceras

References

Ammonitida families
Stephanoceratoidea 
Middle Jurassic first appearances
Late Jurassic extinctions